The 2001 winners of the Torneo di Viareggio (in English, the Viareggio Tournament, officially the Viareggio Cup World Football Tournament Coppa Carnevale), the annual youth football tournament held in Viareggio, Tuscany, are listed below.

Format

The 40 teams are seeded in 10 pools, split up into 5-pool groups. Each team from a pool meets the others in a single tie. The winning club from each pool and three best runners-up from both group A and group B progress to the final knockout stage. All matches in the final rounds are single tie. The Round of 16 envisions penalties and no extra time, while the rest of the final round matches include 30 minutes extra time with Golden goal rule and penalties to be played if the draw between teams still holds. Semifinal losing teams play 3rd-place final with penalties after regular time. The winning sides play the final with extra time, noGolden goal rule and repeat the match if the draw holds.

Participating teams
Italian teams

  Atalanta
  Bari
  Brescia
  Empoli
  Fiorentina
  Inter Milan
  Juventus
  Lazio
  Milan
  Napoli
  Padova
  Palermo
  Parma
  Perugia
  Reggina
  Roma
  Salernitana
  Siena
  Torino
  Verona
  Vicenza

European teams

  Belasica
  Vilanovense
  Standard Liège
  UTA Arad
  AEK Athens

African teams
  Jomo Cosmos
Asian teams
  Guangdong Chaoneng
American teams

  Independiente Santa Fe
  Pumas
  New York City
  Quilmes
  Juventus Atlético Clube
  Corinthians
  Ituano
  Vitória
  Campinas
  Bauru
  XV de Novembro

Oceanian teams
  Marconi Stallions

Group stage

Group 1

Group 2

Group 3

Group 4

Group 5

Group 6

Group 7

Group 8

Group 9

Group 10

Knockout stage

Champions

Notes

External links
 Official Site (Italian)
 Results on RSSSF.com

2001
2001 in Brazilian football
2000–01 in Italian football
2000–01 in Republic of Macedonia football
2000–01 in Portuguese football
2000–01 in Belgian football
2000–01 in Romanian football
2000–01 in Greek football
2000–01 in South African soccer
2001 in Chinese football
2001 in American soccer
2001 in Colombian football
2000–01 in Mexican football
2000–01 in Argentine football
2001 in Australian soccer